The Harry Belafonte 115th Street Branch of the New York Public Library is a historic library building located in Harlem, New York City. It was designed by McKim, Mead & White and built in 1907–1908 and opened on November 6, 1908.  It is a three-story-high, three-bay-wide building faced in deeply rusticated gray limestone in a Neo Italian Renaissance style. The branch was one of 65 built by the New York Public Library with funds provided by the philanthropist Andrew Carnegie, 11 of them designed by McKim, Mead & White.  The building is 50 feet wide and features three evenly spaced arched openings on the first floor. The branch served as Harlem cultural center and hub of organizing efforts.

It was listed on the National Register of Historic Places in 1980. In 2017, the branch was renamed to honor Harry Belafonte who lived near the branch. Another branch of the Library, the Schomburg Center holds Belafonte's archives.

See also
 List of New York City Designated Landmarks in Manhattan above 110th Street
 National Register of Historic Places listings in Manhattan above 110th Street

References

Library buildings completed in 1908
Libraries on the National Register of Historic Places in Manhattan
Renaissance Revival architecture in New York City
Carnegie libraries in New York City
115th Street Branch
1908 establishments in New York City
Education in Harlem